Ahmed Hasan Ali Al-Gubbanchi is an Iraqi intellectual, born in Najaf in 1958, who focuses on developing a "Civil Islam" which is consistent with human rights, justice and modern circumstances, addressing the problems of traditional Islamic thought as he thinks that the literal interpretation of Quran leads to the incapability of Islam to get use of modern development and achievements, which leads, in turn, to the end of Islam, he sees every Islamic thought as a mere opinion on Islam and that the Islamic scripture had to comply with the historic situations of the ancient society of the prophet Mohammed, therefore it can not be considered literally, he considers Sharia alterable depending on the society, time and place, one of the evidence to support that is the Quran verses themselves whose orders have been changed at the time of the prophet which is called Naskh. He also translated many books of Abdolkarim Soroush into Arabic.

Thoughts

Ahmed Al-Gubbanchi sees worshiping as a means not an end itself, and that if it will not improve the morality of the human being, it is useless, noting in an interview with Al-Baghdadia Channel that most of the terrorists of today are religious and good worshipers, he sees that the traditional Islamic thought unable to find a solution for many problematic issues, for instance, it is unable to address clearly the relation between the situation and time of the early Islamic society of the prophet Muhammad and the scripture, therefore still considering many regressive issues as part of Islamic Sharia, like, Apostasy, Stoning, Inequality for women, discrimination against non-Muslims in the Islamic society. The way to get rid of these practices is, according to him, in addition to criticism of Hadith as he has done in his book (Rectification of the Hadith of Shia), also to rethink the whole concept of inspiration, he comes up with the belief that the words of Quran is not the literal word of God, rather the meanings is from God, while the knowledge and the phrasing of Quran is from the prophet himself intended to suit with the conditions of his time, which is why, he allowed seven ways of reading the Quran, he also believes that Muslims need not to consider the verses of Quran literally today when they conflict with the "Practical reason", just as Mu'tazila did formerly with the verses which conflict with the "Theoretical reason".

Books 

He has written many books (in Arabic) and translated many others into Arabic including:

Authored:

 Civil Islam
 Islam the religion
 Prophecy and the problem of divine inspiration
 Rectification of the Hadith of Shia
 The divine justice and freedom of the human
 The woman, the concepts and rights
 Theories in Psychology

Translated for Abdolkarim Soroush

 The Secular Religion
 The reason and freedom
 Politics and Religiousness

References
(In Arabic)

1958 births
Living people
20th-century Muslim scholars of Islam
Iraqi scholars
Iraqi writers
Muslim reformers
Iraqi Shia Muslims
Iraqi secularists
Critics of Islamism